The North Sea Pro Series was a professional cricket league featuring teams from the Netherlands and Scotland, first contested in 2014. A joint venture between the Royal Dutch Cricket Board (KNCB) and Cricket Scotland, the Pro Series comprised a 50-over tournament, the North Sea Pro 50, and a 20-over tournament, the North Sea Pro 20.

The first fully professional league in either country, the competition had been described as "formulated to bridge the gap between club and international cricket for professional cricketers". The inaugural season featured four franchises, two from the Netherlands and two from Scotland, and both the 50-over and 20-over tournaments were won by the Highlanders, a Scottish franchise.

In 2016, the North Sea 50 Trophy was held on 1 September as a final match between the Dutch 50 over champions the South Holland Seafarers and the Scottish 50 over champions Eastern Knights. 

The series did not return in 2017, replaced in Scotland by the Regional Pro Series featuring three domestic franchises, the first edition of which was held in 2016.

Background
Cricket Scotland and the KNCB are both associate members of the International Cricket Council (ICC), and both the Dutch and Scottish national teams have played in multiple World Cups. Both teams currently have Twenty20 International (T20I) status, while Scotland also holds One Day International (ODI) status. The impetus for the creation of the Pro Series was the exclusion of the Dutch and Scottish national sides from the new Royal London One-Day Cup, which replaced the Friends Provident Trophy as the premier limited-overs competition in England and Wales. Andy Tennant, performance director for Cricket Scotland, described the Pro Series as "an ideal opportunity for us to stand on our own two feet and begin to develop a strong domestic professional competition for our best cricketers."

The North Sea Pro Series, contested in May and early June during the 2014 season, does not overlap with the Scottish National Cricket League or the Dutch Topklasse, the top-level club competitions in each country.

Franchises

Grounds

Champions

Pro 20 Championship

Pro 50 Championship

2014 season

Squads

Table

Pro 20 Championship

Pro 50 Championship

2015 season

Table

Pro 20 Championship

References

Cricket in Scotland
Recurring sporting events established in 2014
2014 establishments in the Netherlands
2014 establishments in Scotland
Cricket in the Netherlands
International cricket competitions
Professional cricket leagues